Juan Carlos Velasco Pérez (born 3 August 1952) is a Mexican politician from the Institutional Revolutionary Party. He served as Deputy of the LIII and LX Legislatures of the Mexican Congress representing Michoacán.

References

1952 births
Living people
Politicians from Michoacán
Institutional Revolutionary Party politicians
21st-century Mexican politicians
Deputies of the LX Legislature of Mexico
Members of the Chamber of Deputies (Mexico) for Michoacán